St. Joseph's Chapel of the Manhattan State Hospital is a former Roman Catholic parish church under the authority of the Roman Catholic Archdiocese of New York, located in the vicinity of Manhattan State Hospital on Ward Island Manhattan, New York City. The parish was established in 1872.

References 

Religious organizations established in 1872
Closed churches in the Roman Catholic Archdiocese of New York
Closed churches in New York City
Roman Catholic churches in Manhattan
1872 establishments in New York (state)
Roman Catholic chapels in the United States